The Inter Varsity Folk Dance Festival (IVFDF) is the longest running folk festival in the United Kingdom, having been hosted from 1951 to the present day (2022).

It differs from most other festivals in two respects: it moves location every year, and it is hosted and organised by student folk societies. Ex-students and folk music enthusiasts gather at the host university for a weekend of music, dance, and song. The festival is always run in either the last weekend in February or the first weekend in March. The festival at Exeter University in 2009 was attended by around 1169 different ticket holders — the most of any IVFDF up to that time, as the previous record was just over 1000 attendees at the IVFDF in Manchester in 1986.

The festival was held online in 2021 due to the COVID-19 pandemic, hosted by people based in Bristol. The most recent festival was held in Exeter in 2023.

Mascots 
Society mascots are considered to be a large part of the festival. Mascot Ransoming is now banned at IVFDF after several people sustained injuries at one festival. While Mascot Ransoming has been banned, mascot intentional misplacement is prevalent at IVFDFs.

History 
The first festival was held in 1951 under the name "Universities' Folk Dancing Festival", hosted in the city of Leeds. The festival was jointly organised by the Hull University College Folk Dance Society and the Leeds University Scottish Dance Society, however Leeds was chosen over Hull as the location for the festival due to its superior accessibility and facilities at the time. The following 2 festivals were hosted under this name before the term Inter-Varsity was used for the 1954 festival hosted in Edinburgh.

Initially the primary activity at the festival was the "Display Ceilidh", during which the University groups in attendance would take turns to perform dances as a demonstration to the other groups. The dances presented could be newly choreographed or traditional, and could be chosen to raise awareness of a particular folk style or show the skill of the group. In some early festivals a dance was also held in the evening after the Display Ceilidh, and by the 1959 festival this had been expanded to two evening dances.

The festival has never been held in the same host city two years consecutively, with 22 different cities hosting thus far. The most frequent hosts have been Sheffield and Exeter, totalling 10 and 8 festivals respectively.

All IVFDF events

ICBINI 
I can't believe it's not IVFDF (ICBINI) is a smaller annual spin-off festival held in November. The first ICBINI was held at Exeter in 2002. ICBINI is like the main festival in many respects, in that it is held at a different location each year and hosted by student folk societies; however, if a suitable host cannot be found, a festival is not held that year. The activities are similar to those at IVFDF.

References

External links 
Central IVFDF
IVFDF 2012 (Aberdeen)
IVFDF 2011 (Bristol)
IVFDF 2010 (Durham)
IVFDF 2009 (Exeter)
IVFDF 2008 (Sheffield)
IVFDF 2021 (online)

Folk festivals in the United Kingdom
Dance festivals in the United Kingdom
English folk music
1951 establishments in England
Music festivals established in 1951